Thiazinamium metilsulfate (INN) or thiazinam is an antihistamine. The USAN is thiazinamium chloride (with a different counterion).

Synthesis 
Since many of the uses of antihistamines involve conditions such as rashes, which should be treatable by local application, there is some rationale for developing drugs for topical use. The known side effects of antihistamines could in principle be avoided if the drug were functionalized to avoid systemic absorption. The known poor absorption of quat salts make such derivatives attractive for nonabsorbable antihistamines for topical use.

Thus, reaction of the well-known antihistaminic drug promethazine with methylchloride leads to thiazinamium chloride.

See also 
 Phenothiazine
Promethazine

References 

Phenothiazines
Quaternary ammonium compounds
H1 receptor antagonists